Petrophile helicophylla is a species of flowering plant in the family Proteaceae and is endemic to southwestern Western Australia. It is a prostrate, spreading shrub with twisted, needle-like leaves and heads of hairy white to creamy-white or pale pink flowers.

Description

Taxonomy
Petrophile helicophylla was first formally described in 1990 by Donald Bruce Foreman in Muelleria from material he collected near Ravensthorpe in 1979. The specific epithet (helicophylla) means "coil-leaved".

Distribution and habitat
This petrophile grows in low heath, scrub and woodland on sand plains and near salt pans near Ravensthorpe and Jerramungup in the Esperance Plains and Mallee biogeographic regions of southwestern Western Australia.

Conservation status
Petrophile helicophylla is classified as "not threatened" by the Western Australian Government Department of Parks and Wildlife.

References

helicophylla
Eudicots of Western Australia
Endemic flora of Western Australia
Plants described in 1990